The Fairly OddParents is a Canadian-American series of television films produced through Nickelodeon, loosely based on Butch Hartman's animated series The Fairly OddParents. The series consists of three films: Grow Up, Timmy Turner! (2011), A Fairly Odd Christmas (2012), and A Fairly Odd Summer (2014).

Films

A Fairly Odd Movie (2011)

Grow Up, Timmy Turner! premiered on July 9, 2011 and received 5.8 million viewers, following a 23-year-old Timmy Turner (Drake Bell), who is trying to prevent himself from growing up in order to keep his fairy godparents Cosmo, Wanda, and Poof from disappearing from his life. His resolve is tested when Tootie (Daniella Monet) returns to town as a beautiful, grown-up woman, as falling in love would be seen as a sign of adulthood and would cause him to lose his friends. Meanwhile, Mr. Crocker has teamed up with the evil businessman Hugh J Magnate Jr. (Steven Weber) in an attempt to capture Timmy's fairies and use them for their own selfish purposes.

A Fairly Odd Christmas (2012)

First airing: November 29, 2012, 4.473 million viewers

A Fairly Odd Christmas picks up where the first movie left off and follows Timmy and Tootie, who now travel around the world granting wishes. They are unaware that doing this has placed them at odds with Santa Claus (Donavon Stinson), as this is interfering with Christmas and putting the holiday at risk of cancellation.

A Fairly Odd Summer (2014)

First airing: August 2, 2014, 2.8 million viewers

A Fairly Odd Summer has Timmy working at a yuck disposal center in Fairy World while Tootie helps out at the Helping Creatures Dimmsdale Research Center. When Tootie is called away to Hawaii to help save a rare sea creature, Timmy discovers that she has accidentally left her supplies behind and must find a way to give it back to her. Meanwhile, Poof is being pursued by his arch-nemesis Foop (played by Scott Baio in human form, and voiced by Eric Bauza reprising his role in fairy form).

Cast and characters

Crew

References

External links
 
 
 

The Fairly OddParents films
Live-action films based on animated series
Film series introduced in 2011
Trilogies
American film series